Nimoa Island is an island in the Louisiade Archipelago in Milne Bay Province,  Papua New Guinea.

Geography
The island has an area of 3.56 km2, it is part of the Pana Tinani Group. The island is hilly, rising to 140 m at Mt. Nimoa.
The island is 1.7 km north of Vanatinai, and separated from it with the Bulami Channel.

History
The island was discovered in the late 18th century.

Population
At the census of population in 2014, the island had 395 inhabitants, spread across 5 small villages. 
The main town is Soluwo, located on the southwest point.

References

Islands of Milne Bay Province
Louisiade Archipelago